Mothers is a 2017 South Korean drama film directed by Lee Dong-eun, based on his 2015 novel Your Request - My Other Mother. The film stars Im Soo-jung and Yoon Chan-young.

Plot
A woman who lost her husband to an accident has to cope with raising her sixteen-year-old stepson from her husband's previous marriage.

Cast
Im Soo-jung as Hyo-jin
Yoon Chan-young as Jong-wook
Lee Sang-hee as Mi-ran 
Oh Mi-yeon as Myeong-ja
Seo Shin-ae as Joo-mi 
Han Joo-wan as Jeong-woo 
Kim Sun-young as Yeon-hwa
Seo Jeong-yeon as Seo-yeong 
Kim Min-jae as Kyung-taek 
Jang Hye-jin as Jeong-hee
Woo Ji-hyun as Police officer
Kim Ja-young as Mom
Kim Tae-woo as Kyung-soo (special appearance)

Production 
Principal photography began on June 20, 2017. Filming wrapped on July 27, 2017, in Cheongju.

Release 
Mothers had its world premiere at the 22nd Busan International Film Festival and was released on April 19, 2018, in local cinemas.

Awards and nominations

References

External links

2017 films
2017 drama films
South Korean drama films
Films based on South Korean novels
2010s South Korean films